Shek O Peak or Ta Lan Tsing Teng Shan is a hill in southern Hong Kong. It is the tallest hill along the Dragon's Back trail.

Geography

Shek O Peak is 284m in height. To the south lies another hill called D'Aguilar Peak.

Access
Section 8 of the Hong Kong Trail runs through the top ridge of Shek O Peak. It is possible to access the summit of Shek O Peak after hiking for about 30 minutes from the To Tei Wan bus stop on Shek O Road.

See also
 List of mountains, peaks and hills in Hong Kong
 Dragon's Back

References

External links
 Hong Kong Trail No. 8